Pye Bridge railway station served the village of Pye Bridge, Derbyshire, England from 1849 to 1967 on the Erewash Valley Line.

History 
The station opened as Pye Bridge for Alfreton on 1 December 1851 by the Midland Railway. It was renamed Pye Bridge in May 1862. Local passenger services on the Ambergate-Pye Bridge line were stopped on 16 June 1947 and the station closed to both passengers from the Erewash Valley Line and goods traffic on 2 January 1967.

Stationmasters

James Slater Ball ca. 1853
John Waterson until 1862
D. Beattie 1862 - 1863
W.J. Jacques from 1863 
Herbert T. Brown until 1870 
H.P. Jeffries until 1873
James Beebe 1873 - 1905 (formerly station master at Hathern)
William Frederick Best 1905 - 1921 (formerly station master at Codnor Park)
Frank G. Sugars 1921 - 1927 (formerly station master at Shefford, afterwards station master at Newark)
C.V. Bunker 1927 - 1936 (afterwards station master at Rushden)
John Hitchens from 1937 (formerly station master at Codnor Park)
W.A. Bamford ca. 1955

References

External links 

 

Railway stations in Great Britain opened in 1847
Railway stations in Great Britain closed in 1967
1847 establishments in England
1967 disestablishments in England
Former Midland Railway stations
Beeching closures in England